The Chapeltown riots can refer to three different riots in the area of Chapeltown in Leeds. These being:

 1975 Chapeltown riot
 1981 Chapeltown riot
 1987 Chapeltown riot